V1331 Cygni (also known as V1331 Cyg) is a young star in the constellation Cygnus. V1331 Cyg is located in the dark nebula LDN 981.

V1331 Cygni is most noted for having an arc-like reflection nebula surrounding it. This circumstellar disc is a great birthplace for young stars, which form in the cloud.

The General Catalog of Variable Stars classifies V1331 Cygni as an "INST" type variable, meaning a T Tauri star which shows rapid light variations. Its visual band brightness varies from magnitude 13.08 to 10.58. It is sometimes classified as a pre-FUOR star. A semi-regular period of ~449 days has been reported. Unlike many T Tauri stars, the mean brightness of V1331 Cygni remains nearly constant over long time periods.

Gallery

References

Variable stars
Cygnus (constellation)
Cygni, V1331
T Tauri stars